Robert Jackson MacGeorge was an Anglican priest and author in the 19th century.

MacGeorge was born in The Gorbals, Glasgow on 19 December 1808 and educated at the University of Glasgow and the University of Edinburgh. He was ordained in 1839 and served briefly in Glasgow before moving to Canada, where he was the incumbent at Streetsville, Ontario. In 1859 he returned to a post in Scotland at St John the Evangelist, Oban. After this he was Synod Clerk for the Diocese of Argyll and The Isles then its dean until 1880. He died on 14 May 1884.

References and notes

1808 births
People from Gorbals
Alumni of the University of Glasgow
Alumni of the University of Edinburgh
Deans of Argyll and The Isles
1884 deaths
Clergy from Glasgow